LP or lp may stand for:

Businesses and organizations
LP, Limited partnership in corporate law or a Limited Partner in a venture capital fund

In politics
Labour Party (disambiguation), in several countries
Liberal Party, in several countries
Libertarian Party (United States), or a member thereof

Schools
Lower Primary school, a subdivision of primary schools in certain places
Lorne Park Secondary School, a high school in Mississauga, Ontario, Canada

Other businesses and organizations
LAN Perú, an airline based in Lima, Peru (IATA code LP)
Louisiana-Pacific, a manufacturer of building materials
Lowercase people, an organization founded by rock band Switchfoot
Ladakh Police, police agency of Ladakh, India

Science, technology, philosophy

Computing and mathematics
lp (Unix), command for printing documents
Lp space
LPMud, a type of virtual world server software created in 1989
LP or lp, the device name for a printer in some computer operating systems
 A legacy abbreviation derived from line printer but now used for other types of printer
Larch Prover, in automated theorem proving system
Linear programming, in applied mathematics
LivePerson AI-powered chatbot
Logic programming

Medicine and psychology
Licensed Psychologist
Lumbar puncture, a diagnostic and, at times, therapeutic procedure, that is performed to collect a sample of cerebrospinal fluid

Other uses in science and technology
Liquefied petroleum gas, a hydrocarbon gas mixture
Liquid propane
Low power electronics
Low-power broadcasting, in radio and TV broadcasting
Low precipitation supercell, a subtype of highly organized thunderstorm
Sound pressure level, Lp
Luyten-Palomar, astronomical survey catalog of high proper motion stars (LP numbers). L in zones -45 to -89 deg.; LP in zones +89 to -44 deg. See Star catalogue#Proper motion catalogues

Philosophy 
 Logic of Paradox, a paraconsistent logic

Music
LP record, a long-playing 12- or 10-inch (30 or 25 cm) vinyl record that spins at 33⅓ rpm
LP (singer), American indie pop singer
El-P (born 1975), American rapper
Latin Percussion, a brand of percussion instruments
Laxmikant–Pyarelal (1940–1998), Indian music director duo
Gibson Les Paul, electric guitar
Linkin Park, an American rock band from Agoura Hills, California
Liam Payne (born 29 August 1993) an English singer. He rose to fame as a member of the boy band One Direction.

Albums
LP (Ambulance LTD album), 2004
LP (Discovery album), 2009
LP (Holy Fuck album), 2007
LP (Insomniac Folklore album), 2010
LP!, by JPEGMafia, 2021
 LP1 (Liam Payne album) 2019
LP (Landon Pigg album), 2006
The LP, by Large Professor, 1996
L.P. (The Rembrandts album), 1995
LP (Soviettes album), 2003

Other uses
 United Nations laissez-passer, a travel document issued by the United Nations to its staff
Lesson plan, a teacher's detailed description of the course of instruction for a class
Little person, someone affected by Dwarfism
Lower Peninsula of Michigan
Listening post, a facility established to monitor radio and microwave signals
Let's Play, a style of video series documenting the playthrough of a video game
License points, in the video game Final Fantasy XII
 Liquidity provider in finance